This is a list of mothers said to have given birth to 20 or more children and men said to have fathered more than 25 children.

Mothers and couples
This section lists mothers who gave birth to at least 20 children. Numbers in bold and italics are likely to be legendary or inexact, some of them having been recorded before the 19th century. Due to the fact that women bear the children and therefore cannot reproduce as often as men, their records are often shared with or exceeded by their partners.

{| class="wikitable sortable"
|-
! style="text-align:center;width:4%;"|Total children birthed
! style="width:20%;"|Mother or couple (if known)
! style="width:8%;"|Approximate year of last birth
! class="unsortable"|Notes
|-
!69
|Valentina and Feodor Vassilyev
|1765
| Valentina Vassilyev and her husband Feodor Vassilyev are alleged to hold the record for the most children a couple has produced. She gave birth to a total of 69 children – sixteen pairs of twins, seven sets of triplets and four sets of quadruplets – between 1725 and 1765, a total of 27 births. 67 of the 69 children were said to have survived infancy. Allegedly Vassilyev also had six sets of twins and two sets of triplets with a second wife, for another 18 children in eight births; he fathered a total of 87 children. The claim is disputed as records at this time were not well kept.
|-
!57|Mr and Ms Kirillov
|1755
|The first wife of peasant Yakov Kirillov from the village of Vvedensky, Russia, gave birth to 57 children in a total of 21 births. She had four sets of quadruplets, seven sets of triplets and ten sets of twins. All of the children were alive in 1755, when Kirillov, aged 60, was presented at court. As with the Vassilyev case, the truth of these claims has not been established, and is highly improbable.

|-
!53|Barbara and Adam Stratzmann
|1498
|It is claimed that Barbara Stratzmann (c. 1448 – 1503) of Bönnigheim, Germany, gave birth to 53 children (38 sons and 15 daughters) in a total of 29 births by 1498. She had one set of septuplets, one set of sextuplets, four sets of triplets and five sets of twins. Nineteen of the children were stillborn, while the eldest surviving was eight years old in 1498. As with the Vassilyev, Gravata and Kirillov cases above, the survival of any one of the offspring of the alleged multiple births is questionable, as is the likelihood of so many multiple births in an era before fertility treatments.
|-
!44|Mariam Nabatanzi Babirye
|2016
|Mariam Nabatanzi from Uganda gave birth to 44 children (43 survived infancy) by the age of 36. This included 3 sets of quadruplets, 4 sets of triplets and 6 sets of twins, due to a rare genetic condition causing hyperovulation. In 2019, at the age of 40, she underwent a medical procedure to prevent any further pregnancies.
|-
!42|Elizabeth and John Mott
|1720
|Elizabeth Mott of Monks Kirby, Warwickshire, married in 1676 and produced 42 live-born children. She died in 1720.
|-
!41|Alice Hookes
|1553
|According to the inscription on a gravestone in Conwy Church cemetery, Gwynedd, North Wales, Nicholas Hookes (died 1637) was the 41st child of his mother Alice Hookes, but there were no further details.
|-
!39|Elizabeth and William Greenhill
|1681
|Thomas Greenhill was the last child of 39 by his mother Elizabeth (1615–1681) and William Greenhill. The family consisted of 7 sons and 32 daughters. Not only is this a large number of live newborns, but is unusual in that all but one pair of twins were single births.
|-
!35|Ms and Mr Harrison
|1736
|Ms Harrison, the wife of an undertaker residing in Vere Street, London, gave birth to her 35th child by one husband in 1736.
|-
| style="text-align:center;"|33
|Mary and John Jonas
|1892
|Mary Jonas (1814–1899) gave birth to 33 children, including 15 sets of boy–girl twins. All were christened, but few reached adulthood. Ten children were still alive when their father John died in 1892.
|-
| style="text-align:center;"|32
|Moddie and Purcell Oliver
|1959
|Ms Moddie Mae Oliver, aged 50, wife of a Lumberton, North Carolina, sharecropper, was expecting her 33rd child in 1959. At that time, 22 of her children were alive.
|-
| style="text-align:center;"|32
|Maria Addolorata Casalini
|1970
|Ms Casalini (born 1929) of Brindisi, Italy, married at 17 and gave birth to her 32nd child on 11 November 1970. She had two sets of quadruplets, one of triplets, one of twins and nineteen single births. Only 15 children survived.
|-
| style="text-align:center;"|32
|Madalena and Raimundo Carnauba
|1961
|Madalena Carnauba of Ceilândia, Brazil married at 13 and gave birth to 32 children: 24 sons and 8 daughters.
|-
| style="text-align:center;"|32
|Maria Benita Olivera
|1989
|Ms Olivera (born 1939) of San Juan, Argentina, gave birth to her 32nd child on 31 January 1989. All children were believed to be alive at that time. She was married twice, and had a set of triplets (born when she was 13) and two sets of twins.
|-
| style="text-align:center;"|30
|Rebecca Town
|1851
|Ms Town (1807–1851) of Keighley, Yorkshire, had 30 children, but only one reached age 3.
|-
| style="text-align:center;"|28
|Griffith and Elizabeth Johnson
|1790
|Elizabeth G Johnson was born in 1732 in Montgomery, Maryland. She married Griffith Johnson on 16 February 1766, in Annapolis, Maryland. They had 28 children in 31 years. She died on 30 January 1790, in Oldtown, Maryland, at the age of 58, and was buried there.
|-
| style="text-align:center;"|28
|Mabel Murphy
|1949
|Ms Murphy (born 1898) of Lisnaskea, Co. Fermanagh, N. Ireland was reported to have produced 28 children (12 stillborn) in 32 years of marriage by December 1949, but this claim has not been fully substantiated.
|-
| style="text-align:center;"|27
|Irene (née Cooke) and James Arthur Robinson
|1936
|Ms Robinson of Oyen, Alberta gave birth to her 27th child in 1936. She had 27 children, including six sets of twins in a 24-year period. Eleven children died as babies.
|-
| style="text-align:center;"|27
|Marie-Elise (née Chamberland) and Heliodore Cyr
|1959
|Marie-Elise Chamberland and Heliodore Cyr married in 1928 and had 27 children by 1959, all single births. 19 of them survived to adulthood. Mr Cyr, a potato farmer from Saint-François-de-Madawaska, New Brunswick, appeared on the TV show I've Got A Secret three times – after the births of his 25th, 26th and 27th children.
|-
| style="text-align:center;"|26
|Marilouise (Landry) and William Croteau
|1919
|Marielouise and William Croteau had 26 children in St. Patrice-de-Beaurivage, Québec including six sets of twins. Two died as infants, one at 10 months, and one at four years. 21 survived to adulthood. The last to survive was Madeleine Croteau Houle who lived to be 102 and died on January 31, 2021.
|-
| style="text-align:center;"|25
|Wéber Andrásné Szirotek Teréz
|1899
|Ms Wéber (b. 30 September 1855) of Csömör, Hungary gave birth to 25 children between 1872 and 1899. She was awarded with a silver medal on 20 August 1930 on the 'Magyar anyák nemzeti ünnepe' (Hungarian Mothers National Day).
|-
| style="text-align:center;"|25
|Lapa Piagenti and Giacomo di Benincasa
|1347
|Their 23rd child was Saint Catherine of Siena.
|-
| style="text-align:center;"|25
|Ada Watson
|1931
|Ms Watson (1886–1974) of Cambridge gave birth to 25 children, including three sets of twins, during the period 1904–1931. All of the children attained majority.
|-
|style="text-align:center;"|24
|Virginia Elizabeth Newton Williford and Henderson H. Williford
|1910
|Virginia Elizabeth and Henderson H. Williford had 24 children in The Tallyho Township of Granville County, NC From 1882 - 1910  1 set of twins, 1 set of triplets with 19 pregnancies.  
|-
| style="text-align:center;"|24
|Kathleen Scott
|1958
|Ms Scott (b. 4 July 1914) of Dublin gave birth to her 24th child on 9 August 1958. Twenty of her children were still alive in 1990.
|-
| style="text-align:center;"|24
|Marcella S. (née Mills) Big Crow and James M. Big Crow Sr.
|1989
|Marcella Mills-Big Crow (1924–1989) of Pine Ridge, South Dakota, had 24 children, including eight pairs of twins. Five children died in infancy.
|-
| style="text-align:center;" |23
|Christine of Mecklenburg-Güstrow and Louis Christian, Count of Stolberg-Gedern
|1705
|The great-great-great-grandmother of Queen Victoria of the United Kingdom had 23 children in 19 pregnancies between 1684 and 1705 (including four sets of twins); 11 of them survived to adulthood.
|-
| style="text-align:center;" |23
|Queen Darejan and King Heraclius II of Georgia
|1807
|They had a total of 23 children, 13 of whom lived to adulthood.
|-
| style="text-align:center;" |23
|Tabatha Marcum and Silas Mainord
|1811
|Married in 1811, they lived in Overton County, Tennessee, and produced 23 children. One of their daughters, Syreana, later became the mother of 17.
|-
| style="text-align:center;" |23
|Grace Bagnato
|1938
|Grace Bagnato and her husband had 23 children; nine of them were conceived in order to compete for a bequest by a Toronto eccentric, in what became known as the Great Stork Derby.
|-
| style="text-align:center;" |23
|Irene and Charles DeMello
|1958
|Irene DeMello of Tiverton, Rhode Island, gave birth to her 23rd child in February 1958 at the age of 40 in her 25 years of marriage. There were no multiple births. Seventeen of the children were alive, the eldest being 23.
|-
| style="text-align:center;" |23
|Mary and Sylvester Hemsing
|1951
|Mary Hemsing (1913–2014) of Rolling Hills, Alberta, Canada, gave birth to 11 boys and 12 girls, one of whom was stillborn.
|-
| style="text-align:center;" |22
|Ursula and 
|1712
|The German Count Franz Adolf Dietrich von Ingelheim (1659–1742) of Mainz and his wife Ursula (1668–1730) had 22 children between 1683 and 1712.
|-
| style="text-align:center;" |22
| Lady Emily FitzGerald
|1778
|Emily FitzGerald, Duchess of Leinster and her first husband James FitzGerald, 1st Duke of Leinster, had nineteen children born between 1748 and 1773. Later she married her children's tutor William Ogilvie; they had three children, who were born between years 1775 and 1778.
|-
| style="text-align:center;" |22
|Ms and Mr Hostetter
|1941
|Roy Hostetter, a 46-year-old Pennsylvania miner, and his wife, aged 42, announced the birth of their 22nd child in May 1941.
|-
| style="text-align:center;" |22
|Charlotte and Marlon Story
|1946
|Charlotte Story of Bakersfield, California, gave birth to her 22nd child in July 1946. At the time, 19 of the other 21 children, including four sets of twins, were alive. Marion and Charlotte Story participated in You Bet Your Life in 1950.
|-
| style="text-align:center;" |22
|Ms Dick Renata
|1948
|Ms Dick Renata, a Maori, of Hawkes Bay, New Zealand, gave birth to her 22nd child in November 1948. Fourteen of her children survived, including the second born, who was 21 at the time she gave birth to the 22nd, and was himself a father.
|-
| style="text-align:center;" |22
|Madeleine and Marce Devaud
|1952
|Madeleine Devaud, wife of a village dairyman of La Gorre, western France, gave birth to her 22nd child, a boy, in March 1952, at the age of 42. The Devaud couple, married for 24 years, had 13 girls and seven boys. Two other children died in infancy.
|-
| style="text-align:center;" |22
|Mabel Constable
|1950
|Ms Constable (born 1920), of Long Itchington, Warwicks, gave birth to 22 children, including a set of triplets and two sets of twins.
|-
| style="text-align:center;" |22
|Margaret McNaught
|1945
|Ms McNaught (born 1923), of Balsall Heath, Birmingham, gave birth to 22 children, 12 boys (2 of them died in infancy) and 10 girls, all single births.
|-
| style="text-align:center;" |22
|Effie (née Estes) and Charles Dickey
|1914
|From Clinton, Maine, Ms Dickey gave birth to 22 children, all single births. All of them lived to adulthood, with 18 of them living at least 70 years of age (the others died at ages 30, 58, 60 and 67).
|-
| style="text-align:center;" |22
|Unidentified Romani woman
|1998
|A 38-year-old Romani woman of Lom, Bulgaria, gave birth to her 22nd child in March 1998. She and her husband had no jobs. 17 children lived with them and five were in orphanages.
|-
| style="text-align:center;" |22
|Alice (née Spencer) & John Jennings
|1660
|Jennings was an MP of St. Albans before the English Civil War. He names 3 of these children in his will, dated 1642, and his wife's will names 7 of them, dated 1663. Their granddaughter was Sarah Churchill, Duchess of Marlborough.
|-
| style="text-align:center; " |22
|Sue and Noel Radford
|2020
|Sue (Suzanne) Radford has given birth to 22 children as of April 2020, 11 boys and 11 girls, all single births. Alfie (their 17th) was stillborn. At this time, their eldest son (Christopher) is 30 years old. They have six grandchildren. They have a bakery which is the family business and live in Morecambe, Britain. All of them are healthy and thriving. The Channel 5 tv series 22 kids and counting documents their lives
|-
| style="text-align:center;" |21+
|Mary Susannah Roberts (née Sautelle) and John Roberts
|1749
|18th-century Irish architect and his wife. Of their children, said to number 21 or 24, only eight survived to adulthood, including the painters Thomas Roberts and Thomas Sautelle Roberts.
|-
| style="text-align:center;" |21
|Johanna O'Sullivan and William O'Daly
|1837
|They had 21 children in 29 years, 6 sons and 15 daughters, born between 1808 and 1837 in Gurrane, Currans, County Kerry, Ireland. There were no multiple births, and all of the children were born alive - it is likely that there were a number of stillborn children too. Four children died in childhood, and the last child, Bridget Russell, died in 1923. Descendants of Johanna and William include Commandant General Charlie Daly, Senator Mark Daly, Senator Lorraine Clifford-Lee, and Siobhán Fleming, captain of the Munster Women rugby team.
|-
| style="text-align:center;" |21
|Barbara Bremner and Thomas Burns
|1978
|Barbara and Thomas resided in Rogers Park on the north side of Chicago. Barbara gave birth to 21 single birth live children. She had her first daughter in 1951, and last in 1978. They supported their children on Tom's salary as an electrician, and Barbara ran a secretarial and phone-answering service, called Barb's Wire, from her home for many years. All 21 children reached adulthood.
|-
| style="text-align:center;" |21
|Olivia (née Whitmore) and Arthur Guinness
|1783
|Guinness was an Irish brewer. Only ten of their children lived to adulthood.
|-
| style="text-align:center;" |21
|Ann Clark Skerrett and Jeremiah Lear
|1812
|Their 20th child was English artist, illustrator, musician, author and poet Edward Lear (born 1812).
|-
| style="text-align:center;" |21
|Olivia (née Gutenberger) and Rudolph Schoelzel Sr.
|1949
|They had 21 children in 24 years, 11 sons and 10 daughters, born between 1925 and 1949 in Colby, Wisconsin, USA. There were no multiple births. One daughter died in infancy, and one son died in 1947, aged 21.
|-
| style="text-align:center;" |21
|Domitille (née Brun) and Pierre Martin
|1861
||They had 21 children in 25 years, 11 sons and 10 daughters, born and baptized between 1835 and 1861 in Saint-Cyprien-de-Napierville, Québec, Canada. There were no multiple births.
|-
| style="text-align:center;" |21
| Teodora (née Lopez) and Raymundo Olivas
|1853
| Born in 1809 in Los Angeles, Raymundo Olivas met his future wife, Teodora Lopez, in Santa Barbara. They were married in 1832, and together they had 21 children – 13 boys and eight girls. In 1841 Raymundo built the Olivas Adobe, an important part of Ventura city's cultural heritage.
|-
| style="text-align:center;" |21
|Josephine & Michael Salzo Sr.
|1923
|The 21 children included the first known surviving set of quadruplets in New Haven, Connecticut; triplets; and two sets of twins.
|-
| style="text-align:center;" |21
|Anna and Henry Crocker
|1963
|18 of their children lived to adulthood.
|-
| style="text-align:center;" |21
|Ms and Mr Albert Cunningham
|1930
|The couple from Iron Mountain, Michigan, welcomed their 21st child in September 1930 after 27 years of marriage. Seventeen of their children were alive.
|-
| style="text-align:center;" |21
|Mary Chaloner Hale
|1789
|The wife of General John Hale (1728–1806), Mary Hale (1743–1803, born Mary Chaloner in Guisborough, Yorkshire, England) bore 21 offspring between the years of 1764 and 1789, including her first child, John Hale.
|-
| style="text-align:center;" |21
|Elizabeth Hudson
|1955
|Ms Hudson, of London, the wife of a paint sprayer, gave birth to her 21st child in February 1955, at the age of 45. Sixteen of the children were alive.
|-

| style="text-align:center;" |21
|Mary and Wara Tengu
|1968
|The Maori couple from Hamilton, New Zealand, welcomed their 21st child in January 1968; the mother was then 42 years old. They already had five grandchildren.
|-
| style="text-align:center;" |21
|Ofelia Llanes Gaxiola
|1960
|Ms Ofelia Llanes Gaxiola, of Culiacán, Sinaloa. the wife of a postman, gave birth to her 21 children.
|-
| style="text-align:center;" |21
|Aliza and Meir Ben-Haroush
|1969
|Aliza Ben-Haroush of Haifa gave birth to her 21st child in July 1969 at the age of 46 and became the most prolific mother in Israel.
|-
| style="text-align:center;" |21
|Unidentified Indian woman
|1970
|Not much is known about this case except that a woman from Assam gave birth to her 21st child in 1970.
|-
| style="text-align:center;" |21
|Leonora and Yanosh Nameni
|2013
|Leonora Nameni, of Ostritsa, Hertsa Raion, Chernivtsi Oblast, gave birth to her 21st child in October 2013, at the age of 44, becoming the most prolific mother in Ukraine. Leonora and Yanosh are followers of the Apostolic Christian Church (Nazarene) and do not practice birth control. The Nameni family has 11 sons and 10 daughters, including two sets of twins.
|-
| style="text-align:center;" |21
| Sebastiana Maria da Conceicao
|2015
| Sebastiana Maria da Conceicao, aged 51, gave birth to her 21st child in the city of Aracaju, Brazil, in May 2015. The boy joined the family of 10 brothers and 10 sisters, of whom 18 were alive.
|-
| style="text-align:center;" |20
|Elizabeth and William Dunn
|1798
|Atwick, Yorkshire William Dunn and his wife Elizabeth née Marson of Atwick, Yorkshire, England, were married on 7 February 1774. They had 20 children born between 1774 and 1798, no multiple births, but two children were stillborn. The Atwick Baptism Records state that Ann born 1798 and baptised on 28 October 1798 was 'their 20th child'. On their son Benjamin's baptism in 1797 the record states that he was their '19th child 17 of which were baptised and 2 stillborn in the space of 23 years'.
|-
| style="text-align:center;" |20
|Jane (née Purdon) and Adam Loftus.
|1590
|The archbishop of Armagh, and later of Dublin, and Lord Chancellor of Ireland, Adam Loftus, had 20 children with his wife Jane between c. 1559 and 1590, twelve of whom survived to adulthood.
|-
| style="text-align:center;" |20
|Catherine Marion de Druy and Antoine Arnauld
|1612
|Famous French lawyer Antoine Arnauld had 20 children with his wife Catherine Marion de Druy between 1588 and 1612, ten of whom survived to adulthood.
|-
| style="text-align:center;" |20
|Elizabeth Carleton
|1681
|Elizabeth Carleton, daughter of Sir Dudley Carleton, had one child, daughter Elizabeth, with her first husband Thomas Barker, and 19 children with her second husband Giles Vanbrugh, 12 of whom survived infancy, including English architect and dramatist John Vanbrugh (1664 – 1726) and Commodore Governor of Newfoundland Philip Vanbrugh (c. 1681 – 1753).
|-
| style="text-align:center;" |20
|Marie Elisabeth of Eggenberg and Ferdinand Joseph
|1685
|Ferdinand Joseph had 20 children with his wife Marie Elisabeth of Eggenberg between 1657 and 1685 (all single births), of whom only five survived to adulthood.
|-
| style="text-align:center;" |20
| Anne Margrethe Rossing and Peder Horrebow
|1718
| Danish astronomer Peder Horrebow and his wife Anne Margrethe Rossing had a total of 20 children. One of their sons, Christian Horrebow, born 1718, continued his father's astronomical studies.
|-
| style="text-align:center;" |20
|Barbe Arnault and Antoine Monneron
|1758
|Barbe Arnault and Antoine Monneron had 20 children between 1733 and 1758 (all single births), 12 of whom survived infancy. Their sons became well known Monneron brothers.
|-
| style="text-align:center;" |20
|Rosgen (née Fuld) and Hayum Lowenstein
|1860
|Rosgen and Hayum Lowenstein of Langendernbach, Germany, had 20 children, 19 of whom survived to adulthood. The youngest child was born in 1860.
|-
| style="text-align:center;" |20
|Marie Verrault and Pierre Edouard Cauchon
|1882
|Born between 1853 and 1882 at Château-Richer, Québec, Canada, sixteen of the children died in infancy, and one as a young adult. There were no multiple births.
|-
| style="text-align:center;" |20
|Florestine Piché and Gaspard Beaupré
|1881
|Florestine Piché and Gaspard Beaupré had 20 children; the eldest of them was famous giant Édouard Beaupré, born in 1881 in Willow Bunch, Saskatchewan.
|-
| style="text-align:center;" |20
|Emma Catherine Padgett and Addison Bidwell Millard
|1890
|Addison Millard (1843–1898) and Emma Padgett (1849–1919) married in 1865 in Urbana, Maryland, and had 20 children, the last of whom was born in 1890. Six died in infancy. The family moved to Virginia in 1893, where they ran Colvin Run Mill for more than 50 years.
|-
| style="text-align:center;" |20
|Elise Steinmann and Leonhard Hauser
|1928
|The couple had 20 children, seven of whom died as infants. Elise Steinmann (1848–1928) and Leonhard Hauser (1842–1915) were both born in Switzerland. they immigrated to the US in 1882, and settled in Greenwood (now Greenfield) near Rockford, Minnesota. 13 of their children were born in Switzerland, and seven in the US.
|-
| style="text-align:center;" |20
|Ella and James Lee Townsend
|1917
|Ella and James Lee Townsend, sharecroppers from Montgomery County, Mississippi, had a total of 20 children. The youngest of them was American voting rights activist, civil rights leader, and philanthropist Fannie Lou Hamer, born in 1917.
|-
| style="text-align:center;" |20
|Gertrude Louisa Rowe Goodley and George Thomas Jolley
|1932
|Gertrude and George married in 1905 and had 20 children between 1906 and 1932, when Gertrude was aged 46. The family were from the Tolaga Bay area on New Zealand's North Island. Issue 227 of the Gisborne Photo News carried a report in 1973 about a reunion of 140 of their descendants and noted that they had 215 direct descendants at that time.
|-
| style="text-align:center;" |20
|Mary and John Fullerton
|1935
|Mary and John Fullerton from County Donegal, Ireland, had 20 children, the eldest of whom was Eddie Fullerton, born in 1935.
|-
| style="text-align:center;" |20
|Ms and Mr Rexford Oakley
|1954
|Ms Oakley, aged 54, from Scranton, Pennsylvania, gave birth to her 20th child in December 1954. 18 of the children, including the newborn, were alive.
|-
| style="text-align:center;" |20
|Zola Inez (née Sutterfield) and Harvey Auston Smith
|1956
|Ms Smith (born 1 September 1910) gave birth to her 20th child in Mountain View, Arkansas, in May 1956, at the age of 45. She and her husband, married for 29 years, had 14 sons and six daughters, all single births. Three sons died in infancy. By April 1973 they had 35 grandchildren and two great-grandchildren.
|-
| style="text-align:center;" |20
|Rose Alma and Roland Letendre
|1956
|The couple had 20 children; the youngest died as a result of birth injury. All the children were born in Drummondville, Quebec. Rose Alma died at age 100 in 2018.
|-
| style="text-align:center;" |20
| Ms and Mr Edward Bitter
|1958
| Ms Bitter, aged 40, the wife of a bricklayer, from Covington, Kentucky, gave birth to her 20th child in January 1958. Four of their children, including a set of twins, were dead. The other 16 were 10 boys and six girls; the oldest of them was 24.
|-
| style="text-align:center;" |20
|Dolores and Prosper Grenier
|1961
|Dolores Grenier, aged 43, of Waterville, Maine, gave birth to her 20th child in April 1961. During 26 years of marriage she gave birth to 12 sons and eight daughters, including three sets of twins. Two daughters have died.
|-
| style="text-align:center;" |20
|Eldora and James Parnell
|1966
|Eldora Parnell, aged 42, of Bakersfield, California, gave birth to her 20th child in November 1966, after 27 years of marriage.
|-
| style="text-align:center;" |20
|The mother of Maria Goncales Moreira
|1984
|Not much is known about this case except the fact that she had ten sets of twins. Her daughter also had ten sets of twins (see below).
|-
| style="text-align:center;" |20
|Maria Goncales Moreira
|1984
|Ms Moreira of Rio de Janeiro, Brazil, gave birth to her tenth set of twins (identical boys) on 3 July 1984. Her other twins were 16 girls and two boys. She delivered the first at age 13. Her mother also had ten sets of twins.
|-
| style="text-align:center;" |20
|Jessie Campbell
|1990
|Ms Campbell (born 1946) of Struan, Isle of Skye, Scotland, gave birth to her 20th child on 22 January 1990.
|-
| style="text-align:center;" |20
|Julianna and Ernő Lukács
|1991
|Julianna Lukács and her husband, a Hungarian farmer, have six sons and fourteen daughters. The first child was born in 1966 and the last in 1991.
|-
| style="text-align:center;" |20
|Valentina and Anatoliy Khromykh
|1993
|Valentina Khromykh from Lev-Tolstovsky District, Lipetsk Oblast, Russia, gave birth to 20 children, 11 boys and 9 girls. As of May 2015, 15 of the children were alive (two died in infancy and other three at the ages of 12, 28 and 32), the oldest child was 46 and the youngest was 22. Also by May 2015, Valentina was 64, she had been married to Anatoliy Khromykh for 46 years, and they already had ten grandchildren.
|-
| style="text-align:center;" |20
|Elena and Alexander Shishkin
|2003
|Elena Shishkina (born 1958) of Voronezh Oblast, Russia, gave birth to her 20th child in April 2003, becoming the most prolific mother in Russia; her eldest son was 24 at that time. The Shishkins have 9 sons and 11 daughters, and had 20 grandchildren by November 2012.
|-
| style="text-align:center;" |20
|Marie and Antonín Kludský
|1909
|Marie (1832–1909) and Antonín Kludský (1826–1895) from Bohemia were parents of 20 boys and ancestors of the famous cirque family Kludský.
|-
| style="text-align:center;" |20
| Georgiana Văcaru
|2020
| Georgiana Văcaru (born 1976) from Stoenești, Argeș is the woman with the most children in Romania.
|-
| style="text-align:center;" |20
| Maria (née Potter) and James Burton
|1871
| Maria (1812–1871) and James Burton (1811–1888) of Coggeshall, Essex in England were parents to 20 children, 9 died in infancy and another 2 died young.
|-
| style="text-align:center;" |20
| "Dorothea"
|1550
| Dorothea, an Italian woman who lived at the time of Ambroise Paré, reportedly delivered 20 children in 2 exceptionally large pregnancies. She first carried 9 children, and then 11. It is unknown whether the children survived.
|}

Fathers
This section lists men who have produced at least 25 or more children, usually with different women. Males who have fathered large numbers of children through medical sperm donation are difficult to record. Numbers in italics'' are inexact, particularly of rulers of antiquity.

See also

 List of multiple births
 Baby boom
 Biological exponential growth
 Compound annual growth rate
 Demographic momentum
 Demographic transition
 Density dependence
 Doubling time
 Exponential growth
 Fertility fraud
 Great Stork Derby
 List of countries by population growth rate
 List of sovereign states and dependencies by total fertility rate
 List of population concern organizations
 Logistic function – concept related to logistic model
 Natalism and Antinatalism
 Population bottleneck

Notes

References

Lists of families
Children

Natalism
Polygamy
Most Children
Parenting-related lists